Elisabeth of Furstenburg was the princess of Fürstenburg.

In 1643 she married Ferdinand Egon Friedrich of Fürstenberg (1623–1662), who was the son of Egon VIII of Fürstenberg-Heiligenberg.

References 
http://wc.rootsweb.ancestry.com/cgi-bin/igm.cgi?op=GET&db=freer&id=I38249

Fürstenberg (princely family)
German princesses
1621 births
1662 deaths